The 1982 Avon Championships of Boston  was a women's tennis tournament played on indoor carpet courts at the Boston University Walter Brown Arena  in Boston, Massachusetts in the United States that was part of the 1982 Avon Championships circuit. It was the ninth edition of the tournament and was held from March 15 through March 21, 1982. Unseeded Kathy Jordan won the singles title and earned $30,000 first-prize money.

Finals

Singles
 Kathy Jordan defeated  Wendy Turnbull 7–5, 1–6, 6–4
 It was Jordan's 1st singles title of the year and the 3rd of her career.

Doubles
 Kathy Jordan /  Anne Smith defeated  Rosemary Casals /  Wendy Turnbull 7–6(9–7), 2–6, 6–4

Prize money

References

External links
 International Tennis Federation (ITF) tournament edition details

Avon Championships of Boston
Virginia Slims of Boston
Avon Championships
Virgin